Ochyrotica breviapex is a moth of the family Pterophoridae. It is known from Indonesia, Papua New Guinea, Guadalcanal, Misamis and Mindanao.

References

External links
Papua Insects

Ochyroticinae
Moths described in 1990